The Men's 100m Breaststroke event at the 2007 Pan American Games occurred at the Maria Lenk Aquatic Park in Rio de Janeiro, Brazil on 16—18 July.

Three first round heats were raced, comprising a total of 20 swimmers.  The fastest 16 swimmers from this group qualified to move on to the semifinals stage.  The 16 swimmers who advanced then raced in two semifinals of eight swimmers each, the results being pooled and the fastest eight swimmers advancing to the final.

Scott Dickens won the gold medal, breaking a string of 9 U.S. titles in a row. Before him, only other non-American had won the race, the Brazilian José Fiolo, in the first edition of the Games which this race was held, in 1967.

Medalists

Records

Results

References
 Official Site
 Official Results

Breastroke, Men's 100